Champagne is a Brazilian telenovela produced and broadcast by TV Globo. It premiered on 24 October 1983 and ended on 4 May 1984, with a total of 167 episodes. It's the thirty first "novela das oito" to be aired on the timeslot. It is created and written by Cassiano Gabus Mendes and directed by Paulo Ubiratan, Wolf Maya and Mário Márcio.

Cast

References

External links 
 

TV Globo telenovelas
1983 telenovelas
Brazilian telenovelas
1983 Brazilian television series debuts
1984 Brazilian television series endings
Portuguese-language telenovelas